Sir Kingsley Charles Dunham  (2 January 1910 – 5 April 2001) was one of the leading British geologists and mineralogists of the 20th century. He was a Professor of Geology at the University of Durham from 1950–71.  He was later Professor Emeritus from 1967–2001. He was director of the British Geological Survey from 1967–75.

Early life
Dunham was born in Sturminster Newton, Dorset and moved at an early age with his family to Durham. He attended the Durham Johnston School (then a Grammar School) and then won a Foundation Scholarship to Hatfield College, Durham, graduating with a first-class degree in Geology in 1930 at a time when Arthur Holmes was professor. 

A gifted musician, Dunham was Organ Scholar during his undergraduate days. Following graduation, he pursued research into the Pennine Orefield of the North of England, under the supervision of Arthur Holmes. He graduated with a PhD in 1932 on the subject of Ore deposits of the north Pennines.

Career
Dunham studied at Harvard University under a Commonwealth Fund Fellowship, which led to a master's degree. He returned to the UK as a geologist for the British Geological Survey, working on the iron ores of Cumbria. This came in useful during the Second World War where he was involved in the investigation of the mineral resources of the North of England. This work was later published in the classic volume, The Geology of the North Pennine Orefield.

Dunham returned to Durham University in 1950 as Professor of Geology. During his tenure he supervised the drilling of the Rookhope borehole discovering, as predicted by his colleague Martin Bott, the presence of a concealed granite underlying the Pennines. He was created a Fellow of St John's College, Durham.

In 1967, his career culminated in accepting the directorship of the British Geological Survey, and like his time at Durham, he successfully guided that institution through a period of rapid growth into areas such as geophysics, oceanography and geochemistry. He was knighted in 1972.

Following retirement in 1975, Dunham again returned to Durham as Emeritus Professor, publishing further work on the mineralogy of the North of England.

Honours

Kingsley Dunham received many honours. He was elected a Fellow of the Royal Society in 1955 (and also served on its council) and received its Royal Medal in 1970. He was President of the Yorkshire Geological Society between 1958–59, and was awarded the Sorby Medal of that Society in 1963. 

In 1973, he gave the presidential address to the British Association meeting in Canterbury. Dunham also received honorary doctorates from more than ten universities, both at home and abroad. He was awarded the Wollaston Medal of the Geological Society of London in 1976.

Between 1990 and 2012, the British Geological Survey's headquarters complex, in Keyworth, Nottinghamshire, was named the Kingsley Dunham Centre in his honour. (It is now the Environmental Science Centre.) The relocation and consolidation of the BGS's various, disparate branches to the Keyworth site was one of the lasting legacies of Dunham's time as Director. The Centre opened in 1976, shortly after Dunham's retirement.

Later life

In his later years his eyesight failed him until he was totally blind. However, he still attended the weekly Durham meetings (aided by his friend and colleague Dr Tony Johnson), held by the Arthur Holmes society.

Dunham's son, Ansel, who predeceased him, was Professor of Geology at the University of Hull and the University of Leicester.

References

External links
 Durham University: Department of Earth Sciences
 Geological Society of London
 Royal Society of London
 British Geological Survey

1910 births
2001 deaths
People from Sturminster Newton
People from Durham, England
Alumni of Hatfield College, Durham
Academics of Durham University
20th-century British geologists
Fellows of the Royal Society
Harvard University faculty
Harvard University alumni
Knights Bachelor
English classical organists
British male organists
Presidents of the British Science Association
Royal Medal winners
Wollaston Medal winners
20th-century classical musicians
20th-century English musicians
20th-century organists
20th-century British male musicians
Male classical organists